Congressional Czech Caucus was inaugurated on February 27, 2008 in Washington, D.C.

Members of the Czech Congressional Caucus

US Senate 
(List in progress, March 4, 2008)

Chairmen
 Senator E. Benjamin Nelson (Nebraska) Democrat
 Senator George V. Voinovich (Ohio) Republican

Members
 Senator Robert P. Casey, Jr. (Pennsylvania) Democrat
 Senator Byron Dorgan (North Dakota) Democrat
 Senator Dianne Feinstein (California) Democrat
 Senator Chuck Grassley (Iowa) Republican
 Senator Joseph Lieberman (Connecticut) Independent
 Senator Mel Martinez (Florida) Republican
 Senator Ted Stevens (Alaska) Republican

US House of Representatives
(List in progress, April 10, 2008)

Chairmen
 Congressman Joe Barton (Texas 6th) Republican
 Congressman Daniel Lipinski (Illinois) Democrat
 Congressman Thaddeus G. McCotter (Michigan) Republican
 Congresswoman Ellen Tauscher (California) Democrat

Members
 Rod Blum (Iowa 1st)
 Joe Bonner (Alabama 1st)
 Michael Conaway (Texas 11th)
 Danny K. Davis (Illinois 7th)
 Lincoln Díaz-Balart (Florida 21st)
 Mario Díaz-Balart (Florida 25th)
 Lloyd Doggett (Texas 25th)
 Phil English (Pennsylvania 3rd)
 Jeff Fortenberry (Nebraska 1st)
 Sheila Jackson Lee (Texas 18th)
 Dave Loebsack (Iowa 2nd)
 Don Manzullo (Illinois 16th)
 Harry Mitchell (Arizona 5th)
 Solomon Ortiz (Texas 27th)
 Jan Schakowsky (Illinois 9th)
 Joe Sestak (Pennsylvania 7th)
 John Shimkus (Illinois 19th)
 Mike Turner (Ohio 3rd)

See also
 Caucuses of the United States Congress

External links
 Inauguration of the Czech Caucus, US Czech Embassy's web
 US House – Congressional Czech Caucus, Capitol Impact ciclt.net
 The Committee on House Administration – 110th Congress Congressional Member Organizations (CMOs), The Committee on House Administration's web cha.house.gov

Czech
Czech-American history
Czech-American culture in Washington, D.C.